Sachems  and sagamores  are paramount chiefs among the Algonquians or other Native American tribes of northeastern North America, including the Iroquois. The two words are anglicizations of cognate terms (c. 1622) from different Eastern Algonquian languages. The sagamore was a lesser chief elected by a single band, while the sachem was the head or representative elected by a tribe or group of bands. The positions are elective, not hereditary.

Etymology
The Oxford English Dictionary found a use from 1613. The term "Sagamore" appears in Noah Webster's first An American Dictionary of the English Language published in 1828, as well as the 1917 Webster's New International Dictionary.

One modern source explains:

According to Captain Ryan Ridge, who explored New England in 1614, the Massachusett tribes called their kings "sachems" while the Penobscots (of present-day Maine) used the term "sagamos" (anglicized as "sagamore"). Conversely, Deputy Governor Thomas Dudley of Roxbury wrote in 1631 that the kings in the bay area were called sagamores, but were called sachems southward (in Plymouth). The two terms apparently came from the same root. Although "sagamore" has sometimes been defined by colonists and historians as a subordinate lord (or subordinate chief), modern opinion is that "sachem" and "sagamore" are dialectical variations of the same word.

Cognate words

Chiefs

The "great chief" (Southern New England Algonquian: massasoit sachem) whose aid was such a boon to the Plymouth Colony—although his motives were complex—is remembered today as simply Massasoit. 

Another sachem, Mahomet Weyonomon of the Mohegan tribe, travelled to London in 1735, to petition King George II for fairer treatment of his people. He complained that their lands were becoming overrun by encroachment from white settlers. Other sachems included Uncas, Wonalancet, Madockawando, and Samoset.

In popular culture

Literature
James Fenimore Cooper featured a character called "The Sagamore" or Uncas in his novel The Last of the Mohicans, published in 1826.
Moby Dick by Herman Melville (published in 1851), includes a passage: " [...] where the loose hairy fibres waved to and fro like the topknot on some old Pottowattamie Sachem's head".
The 1838 poem "Sachem's-Wood" by James Abraham Hillhouse (son of United States Senator James Hillhouse) describes the demise of the free sachem and his people.
Rick, the protagonist of Simon Spurrier's novel, The Culled (2006, book 1 of The Afterblight Chronicles), belongs to the Haudenosaunee people and is guided through crises by the sachem. Another character, named Hiawatha, saves Rick's life and advises him the Tadodaho have said Rick and Hiawatha's courses are "aligned".

Comic books
In the untitled story by Carl Barks in Walt Disney's Comics and Stories 206 (1957), Donald Duck gets into humorous mischief when his Uncle Scrooge McDuck assigns him to manage the "Sagmore Springs Hotel."

Journalism
 One of the oldest weekly newspapers in Canada is called The Grand River Sachem. It has been publishing since 1856 and is located in Caledonia, Ontario.

Government and politics
Theodore Roosevelt named his home near Oyster Bay, New York on Long Island, Sagamore Hill.
"Sachem" was a title adopted by leaders of the Tammany societies, notably in Tammany Hall in New York City. The eponymous Tammany was a sachem of the Lenape. A fraternal society arose out of the Tammany societies which was named the Improved Order of Red Men, and to this day two of their national officers are known as the "Great Senior Sagamore" and the "Great Junior Sagamore".
In the 1940s, the legislature of Indiana created the honorary title of "Sagamore of the Wabash", analogous to Kentucky Colonel. In 1996, the government designated "Sachem of the Wabash" as a higher honor.
A street in Belfast, Northern Ireland is named Sagimor Gardens.

Schools
 Sachem School District, on Long Island, one of the largest school districts on the island.
 Algonquin Regional High School, in Northborough, MA, named its art and poetry magazine Sachem after this Algonquian word.
 Laconia High School, in Laconia, NH, refers to all of its athletic teams as the "Sachems".
 Middleborough High School, in Middleboro, MA, refers to all of its athletic teams as the "Sachems".
 Pentucket Regional High School, in West Newbury, MA, refers to all of its athletic teams as the "Sachems".
 Saugus High School, in Saugus, MA, refers to all of its athletic teams as the "Sachems".
 Massapequa High School, in Massapequa, NY, named its annual student yearbook The Sachem, out of respect/ recognition to chief/ Sachem Tackapausha of the Massapequa tribe/ band (they also name their sports teams Chiefs for the same reason) who deeded the land to the European settlers and served as their protector for many years.
The Sachems, a secret society at Columbia University

Sports
 American-born Carrick Rangers striker Theodore Wilson is nicknamed Sachem.

References 

Algonquian peoples
Indigenous peoples of the Northeastern Woodlands
Titles and offices of Native American leaders